The 1971 Primera División season was the 80th season of top-flight football in Argentina. The Campeonato Metropolitano championship was modified, returning to a double round-robin format, and four relegations. Nevertheless, the AFA interventor, Raúl D'Onofrio (the 4th interventor since the military dictatorship led by Juan Carlos Onganía removed Valentín Suárez from the Association), reduced the number of relegated teams to two.

The entire season ran from 5 March to 29 December. As champion of 1970 Primera B, Ferro Carril Oeste promoted to Primera División. Independiente (10th title) won the Metropolitano and Rosario Central (coached by Ángel Labruna, not only won the 1st league title for the club but the first for a team outside Buenos Aires) won the Nacional championship. Moreover, both clubs qualified for the 1972 Copa Libertadores (in the case of Independiente, after winning the first "Liguilla pre-Libertadores" edition v San Lorenzo).

Los Andes and Platense were relegated.

Metropolitano Championship

Final standings

Top scorers

Nacional Championship

Group A

Group B

Semifinals
Played in neutral venue:

Final

Match details

Liguilla pre-Libertadores 
This qualifying method debuted in this season. It was contested by the Metropolitano champion and the Nacional runner-up.

Top scorers

References

Argentine Primera División seasons
p
p
Argentine Primera Division
Primera Division